This was the first edition of the tennis tournament.

Maria Sanchez won the title defeating Jessica Pegula in the final 4–6, 6–3, 6–1.

Seeds

Draw

Finals

Top half

Bottom half

References 
Main draw
Qualifying draw

FSP Gold River Women's Challenger - Singles
FSP Gold River Women's Challenger